The list of ship decommissionings in 2018 includes a chronological list of ships decommissioned in 2018.

References

2018
 
Ships